With Love From is the fifth studio album by American duo Aly & AJ, released on March 15, 2023, through AWAL. The duo will promote the album with an 18-date tour across North America in 2023.

Composition
With Love From explores Americana, folk music, and indie pop with influences from country music. Regarding this stylistic choice, AJ Michalka said " I think being that Aly and I come from pop songwriting, that will always be an underbelly to our writing. But I do think opening up into an Americana kind of folk fits Aly and I really well. It's something that we wanted to pursue when we were younger. We also grew up listening to a lot of music that fell into that category. But in a way, when you're a strong songwriter and you're really confident in your work and you're open to working with other people and you're open to diverse ideas, when it comes to kind of floating between genres, I think that's when you can shine because you're not boxing yourself into a genre." The album was recorded shortly after the release of A Touch of the Beat... and enlisted many of the same collaborators. The duo recorded the song live-to-tape when possible, which gives the record "a less glossy, more lived-in feel with lots of raggedly distorted guitars and spacey echo high in the mix". In a review for Paste, Anna Govert wrote "More than anything, Aly & AJ have proven once again that they are so much more than the music they made when they were teenagers. Aly & AJ are releasing career-defining music (and have been for the past six years), and With Love From might top a touch of the beat as their best album to date."

Critical reception

AllMusic writer Heather Phares praised the group's new sound, but considered the more straightforward pop songs to be "forced". Rachel R. Carroll of PopMatters wrote that "While With Love From is not the most visionary pop record released in recent years, it doesn’t need to be. Aly & AJ have an unflinching and often wry songwriting style that is recognizably theirs. They may not have taken many risks with their sound since a touch of the beat, but the care with which they craft their soundscapes makes the argument that consistency doesn’t have to be boring". Anna Govert

Track listing

Release history

References

2023 albums
Aly & AJ albums
AWAL albums
Self-released albums
Americana albums
Folk albums by American artists